Muchetbar (Mäsetbär) is a rural locality (a khutor) in Dmitriyevsky Selsoviet, Zilairsky District, Bashkortostan, Russia. The population was 70 as of 2010. There is 1 street.

Geography 
Muchetbar is located 37 km northwest of Zilair (the district's administrative centre) by road. Novopokrovsky is the nearest rural locality.

References 

Rural localities in Zilairsky District